Sabine Kuegler (born 25 December 1972 in Patan, Nepal) is a German author. She has written several books, two of which have been translated into English. These two books are related to her uncommon childhood: from age 7 to age 17 she lived with her parents and two siblings in the jungle of Waropen, Papua (province) in Indonesia, with the remote tribe of the Fayu.

Her parents were the first whites to live with the newly discovered tribe of about 400 people, who hunted with bow and arrow, ate snakes, insects and worms, and practiced intertribal warfare and revenge killings. The Kueglers were there to study the tribe's language. Her mother, trained as a nurse, performed midwife duties with the tribe. At age 17, Sabine Kuegler left and attended a Swiss boarding school. She is divorced and has four children. Her parents have returned to Germany.

Her best-selling first book Dschungelkind (Jungle Child) (Droemer Knaur, München 2005) describes her experiences in the two different cultures and her occasional nostalgia for the simpler, slower life of the tribe. An English translation (Jungle Child) appeared in the same year and a German film adaptation in 2011. Her second book, Ruf des Dschungels (Call of the Jungle) (Droemer Knaur, München 2006) describes a visit to the Fayu that she undertook in late 2005. A third book, "Jäger und Gejagte" (Hunter and prey) describes her experiences living in Europe.

The German group Gesellschaft für bedrohte Völker criticized her first book, claiming that it romanticized the life of the Fayu and pointing out that it failed to mention the human rights violations of the Indonesian government against West Papuan people, and their endangerment by clearing of the jungle and industrial projects. In her second book and in public appearances, Sabine Kuegler was able to emphasize these political issues, her parents having left West Papua in 2006, enabling her to go public with her political activities. She has aimed to be a spokesperson for the threatened Fayu.

See also
Tippi Degré
 Marlice van Vuuren

References

External links
 Sabine Kuegler, profile, interview and book extract at Virago Press
 BBC Interview, 21 September 2005
 BBC Interview, 28 December 2005
Book review of Jungle Child, Perceptive Travel online magazine, March/April 2007
Interview Daily Telegraph 20.9.2005
 English website for the book Jungle Child.
 German website for the book Dschungelkind (Jungle Child).
 Website of Sabine's sister Judith, https://judithkuegler.wordpress.com/ information on their childhood.

1972 births
Living people
People from Lalitpur District, Nepal
German non-fiction writers